This article describes the history of cricket in Zimbabwe from the 1992–93 season when the country was promoted to full ICC membership.

Events
Zimbabwe was elected to full membership of the ICC in 1992, and played its inaugural Test match versus India at the Harare Sports Club on 18–22 October 1992. The match was drawn, and thus Zimbabwe became the first team to avoid losing its inaugural Test match since Australia beat England in the very first Test in 1877.

The main domestic competition is the Logan Cup which has a long history but which did not acquire first-class status until the 1993–94 season.

Cricket in Zimbabwe was severely impacted by the country's political situation in the early years of the 21st century and the situation has become critical since 2005.  See: Zimbabwean cricket crisis.

National championships
Winners of the Logan Cup from 1993 have been:
 1992–93 – not a first-class competition
 1993–94 – Mashonaland Under-24
 1994–95 – Mashonaland
 1995–96 – Matabeleland
 1996–97 – Mashonaland
 1997–98 – Mashonaland
 1998–99 – Matabeleland
 1999–00 – Mashonaland
 2000–01 – Mashonaland
 2001–02 – Mashonaland
 2002–03 – Mashonaland
 2003–04 – Mashonaland
 2004–05 – Mashonaland

Leading players by season
The lists below give the leading runscorers and wicket-takers in each domestic season.

Batsmen
 1992–93 – KJ Arnott – 281 @ 56.20 (HS 101*)
 1993–94 – A Flower – 620 @ 68.88 (HS 215)
 1994–95 – GW Flower – 983 @ 57.82 (HS 201*)
 1995–96 – DL Houghton – 599 @ 85.57 (HS 160)
 1996–97 – GW Flower – 477 @ 53.00 (HS 243*)
 1997–98 – GW Flower – 742 @ 74.20 (HS 156*)
 1998–99 – A Flower – 469 @ 156.33 (HS 194*)
 1999–00 – GJ Rennie – 666 @ 47.57 (HS 152)
 2000–01 – GJ Whittall – 532 @ 88.66 (HS 188*)
 2001–02 – BB Sijapati – 692 @ 230.66 (HS 199*)
 2002–03 – MA Vermeulen – 696 @ 49.71 (HS 153)
 2003–04 – GM Strydom – 681 @ 61.90 (HS 216)
 2004–05 – DD Ebrahim – 710 @ 54.61 (HS 188)

Bowlers
 1992–93 – AJ Traicos – 11 @ 34.18 (BB 5-86)
 1993–94 – JA Rennie – 23 @ 28.30 (BB 6-34)
 1994–95 – HH Streak – 49 @ 19.77 (BB 6-90)
 1995–96 – BC Strang – 36 @ 21.41 (BB 6-96)
 1996–97 – PA Strang – 36 @ 25.16 (BB 5-45)
 1997–98 – AG Huckle – 22 @ 31.31 (BB 6-109)
 1998–99 – AR Whittall – 16 @ 27.31 (BB 4-49)
 1999–00 – GB Brent – 30 @ 17.86 (BB 6-84)
 2000–01 – BT Watambwa – 34 @ 17.82 (BB 5-36)
 2001–02 – RW Price – 36 @ 22.63 (BB 8-35)
 2002–03 – RW Price – 32 @ 33.18 (BB 8-78)
 2003–04 – RW Price – 42 @ 21.30 (BB 6-73)
 2004–05 – NB Mahwire – 45 @ 18.33 (BB 7-64)

International tours of Zimbabwe from 1992-93 to 2005-06

India 1992-93

 1st Test at Harare Sports Club – match drawn

New Zealand 1992-93

 1st Test at Bulawayo Athletic Club – match drawn	
 2nd Test at Harare Sports Club – New Zealand won by 177 runs

Pakistan 1992-93

Sri Lanka 1994-95

Pakistan 1994-95

 1st Test at Harare Sports Club – Zimbabwe won by an innings and 64 runs	
 2nd Test at Queens Sports Club, Bulawayo – Pakistan won by 8 wickets	
 3rd Test at Harare Sports Club – Pakistan won by 99 runs

South Africa 1995-96

 1st Test at Harare Sports Club – South Africa won by 7 wickets

England 1996-97

 1st Test at Queens Sports Club, Bulawayo – match drawn		
 2nd Test at Harare Sports Club – match drawn

India 1996-97

The Indian team played three limited overs internationals only, out of which India lost all 3 of them at the Harare Sporting Club. The team members included Eddo Brandes, Paul Strang, Alistair Campbell, Andy Flower, Grant Flower, Anthony Ireland, Heath Streak, Guy Whittal, Craig Wishart, Andy Blignaut, A Huckle, G Rennie and M Mbangwa.

New Zealand 1997-98

 1st Test at Harare Sports Club – match drawn		
 2nd Test at Queens Sports Club, Bulawayo – match drawn

Pakistan 1997-98

 1st Test at Queens Sports Club, Bulawayo – match drawn		
 2nd Test at Harare Sports Club – Pakistan won by 3 wickets

India 1998-99

 1st Test at Harare Sports Club – Zimbabwe won by 61 runs

Australia 1999-2000

 1st Test at Harare Sports Club – Australia won by 10 wickets

England 1999-2000

The England team played a series of four limited overs internationals only

South Africa 1999-2000

 1st Test at Harare Sports Club – South Africa won by an innings and 219 runs

Sri Lanka 1999-2000

 1st Test at Queens Sports Club, Bulawayo – match drawn		
 2nd Test at Harare Sports Club – Sri Lanka won by 6 wickets	
 3rd Test at Harare Sports Club – match drawn

Bangladesh 2000-01

 1st Test at Queens Sports Club, Bulawayo – Zimbabwe won by an innings and 43 runs	
 2nd Test at Harare Sports Club – Zimbabwe won by 8 wickets

New Zealand 2000-01

 1st Test at Queens Sports Club, Bulawayo – New Zealand won by 7 wickets	
 2nd Test at Harare Sports Club – New Zealand won by 8 wickets

India 2001

 1st Test at Queens Sports Club, Bulawayo – India won by 8 wickets	
 2nd Test at Harare Sports Club – Zimbabwe won by 4 wickets

West Indies 2001

 1st Test at Queens Sports Club, Bulawayo – West Indies won by an innings and 176 runs	
 2nd Test at Harare Sports Club – match drawn

South Africa 2001-02

 1st Test at Harare Sports Club – South Africa won by 9 wickets	
 2nd Test at Queens Sports Club, Bulawayo – match drawn

England 2001-02

The England team played a series of five limited overs internationals only

Australia 2002
The tour was cancelled for security reasons
 1st Test at Harare Sports Club – game abandoned
 2nd Test at Queens Sports Club, Bulawayo – game abandoned

Pakistan 2002-03

 1st Test at Harare Sports Club – Pakistan won by 119 runs	
 2nd Test at Queens Sports Club, Bulawayo – Pakistan won by 10 wickets

Kenya 2002-03

Bangladesh 2003-04

 1st Test at Harare Sports Club – Zimbabwe won by 183 runs	
 2nd Test at Queens Sports Club, Bulawayo – match drawn

West Indies 2003-04

 1st Test at Harare Sports Club – match drawn		
 2nd Test at Queens Sports Club, Bulawayo – West Indies won by 128 runs

Sri Lanka 2004

 1st Test at Harare Sports Club – Sri Lanka won by an innings and 240 runs	
 2nd Test at Queens Sports Club, Bulawayo – Sri Lanka won by an innings and 254 runs

Australia 2004

The Australians played a series of three limited overs internationals only

England 2004-05

The England team played a series of five limited overs internationals only

New Zealand 2005-06

 1st Test at Harare Sports Club – New Zealand won by an innings and 294 runs	
 2nd Test at Queens Sports Club, Bulawayo – New Zealand won by an innings and 46 runs

India 2005-06

 1st Test at Queens Sports Club, Bulawayo – India won by an innings and 90 runs	
 2nd Test at Harare Sports Club – India won by 10 wickets

Kenya 2005-06

Bibliography
 Wisden Cricketers Almanack 2006

External sources
 ZimbabweCricket
 CricketArchive – List of Tournaments in Zimbabwe

2006
2006
2006